The discography of Kisschasy, an Australian rock band from Melbourne formed in 2002, consists of three studio albums, two compilation albums, three extended plays, one video album and eleven singles.

After forming in 2002, Kisschasy released their two first EPs in 2004, followed by a compilation of the two which was released in Japan, Fire in the Breeze. Their debut album was released in 2005, titled United Paper People. It peaked at number 15 on the ARIA Albums Chart and featured three singles which entered the top 50 of the ARIA Singles Chart. The album was certified gold by ARIA. In 2006, Kisschasy released the DVD titled Kisschasy: The Movie, it documents a tour by the band, a live show and some of their music videos.

In 2007, Kisschasy released their second studio album, titled Hymns for the Nonbeliever. It peaked at number five on the ARIA Albums Chart and featured their most successful single to date, "Opinions Won't Keep You Warm at Night", which peaked at number 10 on the ARIA Singles Chart. The album was also certified gold by ARIA. The band released a compilation album in 2008, Too B or Not Too B, featuring their previous music videos as well as their first two EPs, Darkside / Stay Awake and Cara Sposa.

In 2009, Kisschasy released their third studio album, Seizures.

Albums

Studio albums

Compilation albums

Video albums

Extended plays

Singles

Music videos

Other appearances 
2005: Listen to Bob Dylan: A Tribute - "She Belongs to Me"

References

General
  
 

Specific

External links 
Kisschasy.com Official website

Rock music group discographies
Discographies of Australian artists